Miracle Run is a stream in the U.S. state of West Virginia. It is in Battelle District of Monongalia County. 

Miracle Run was not named for wondrous phenomena, but rather for the pioneering Mirale (or Merrical) family which first settled in the area in 1773.

See also
List of rivers of West Virginia

References

Rivers of Monongalia County, West Virginia
Rivers of West Virginia